is an Osaka-based Japanese professional wrestling promotion founded in 2010 by Eiji Sahara, better known by the ring name Kiai-ryuken Ecchan, with the goal of filling-in the spot left by the closure of Hustle. The name  is a play on the word , meaning "support". The mottoes of the promotion are "Energize Osaka" and "Bring life back to pro-wrestling". In addition to monthly paid shows, the organization holds many free shows in a special outdoor ring at Uehonmachi Hi-Hi Town, next to the Uehonmachi Station.

History 
The promotion was founded by Eiji Sahara, who was a member of the student wrestling club called Osaka Wrestling Federation (OWF) in Osaka Gakuin University, under the ring name  Ecchan. Throughout 2009, Sahara organized a dozen wrestling events with his fellow classmates in a makeshift ring set up in Triangle Park, in Amerikamura, Osaka. The following year, the promotion was officially founded and, on February 20, a pre-launch event titled "ƒ (forte)" was held at the Nipponbashi 4-chōme Theatre. On March 6, a second pre-launch event titled "ƒƒ (fortissimo)" was held in Triangle Park; then, on March 21, the official launching event titled "ƒƒƒ (fortississimo)" was held at the Black Chamber in the Creative Center Osaka.

On February 21, 2015, the promotion held its 5th anniversary event at the Osaka Prefectural Gymnasium.

On September 15, 2018, and March 31, 2019, the promotion took part in two of Keiji Muto's Pro-Wrestling Festival events, held respectively in Kashihara, Nara and Hanyū, Saitama.

On February 9, 2019, the promotion held its first event in Tokyo, at Shin-Kiba 1st Ring.

On March 22, 2020, Shi-En held its 10th anniversary event at Cool Japan Park Osaka.

Personnel

Wrestlers

Sporadic characters

Staff

Notable alumni 
 Jun Masaoka
 Orca Uto (as Battosai Shichiten)
 Toru (as Agu Matsunaga)

Championships and accomplishments 
Shi-En currently has four title. The three main titles are the Pro-Wrestling Shi-En Singles, Tag Team and 6-Man Tag Team Championships. The "I Love Shi-En" Championship is a secondary title.

Pro-Wrestling Shi-En Singles Championship

The  is a professional wrestling championship created and promoted by Pro-Wrestling Shi-En. It is the top title of the company and has been held by a total of six champions in eight different recognized reigns. The current champion is Maro Kuriyama who is in his second reign.

Combined reigns

"I Love Shi-En" Championship

The  is a professional wrestling championship created and promoted by Pro-Wrestling Shi-En. It is a secondary title of the company and has been held by a total of seven champions in twelve different recognized reigns. Anyone can challenge for the title and the reigning champion chooses the stipulation of the matches. The current champion is Raipachi Isobe who is in his second reign.

Combined reigns

Pro-Wrestling Shi-En Tag Team Championship

The  is a professional wrestling tag team championship created and promoted by Pro-Wrestling Shi-En. There have been a total of 17 reigns shared between 17 wrestlers. The current champions are BB Brothers (Bomber Okuno and BBQ Aoki) who are both in their first reign.

Combined reigns

By team

By wrestler

Pro-Wrestling Shi-En 6-Man Tag Team Championship

The  is a professional wrestling tag team championship created and promoted by Pro-Wrestling Shi-En. It is contested for by teams of three wrestlers. There have been a total of four reigns shared between ten wrestlers. The current champions are Bahamut, Daichi and Joker Fuyuki who are in their first reign as a team.

Combined reigns

By team

By wrestler

Tournaments

Footnotes

Notes

References

External links 
  
 
 
 Syu-Kaku Kombu: Pro-Wrestling Shi-En 

Entertainment companies established in 2010
Organizations based in Osaka
Japanese professional wrestling promotions